Cormocephalus delta is a species of centipede in the Scolopendridae family. It is endemic to Australia, and was first described in 2019.

Distribution and habitat
The species occurs in the Fortescue River valley, in the Pilbara region of north-west Western Australia. The centipedes are blind and occupy subterranean habitats.

References

 

 
delta
Centipedes of Australia
Endemic fauna of Australia
Fauna of Western Australia
Animals described in 2019